Carlo Jose Liwanag Aquino (born 3 September 1985) is a Filipino actor and musician known for being the lead singer of the band Kollide and formerly of JCS with John Prats and Stefano Mori. Aquino achieved critical recognition for his performance in the 1998 film Bata, Bata… Pa'no Ka Ginawa? with veteran actress Vilma Santos based on the award-winning novel by Lualhati Bautista.

Life and career
Aquino started his showbiz career as a child actor and rose to popularity as a teen actor during the late 1990s to the early 2000s. Formerly an exclusive contract star of ABS-CBN's Star Magic, he also appeared in some shows of rival station GMA Network as a contract artist under GMA Artist Center. As of 2012, he exclusively works for ABS-CBN again. He dated former on-screen love team Angelica Panganiban during their teens and remained friends after their break-up. Aside from Panganiban, Aquino previously dated Camille Prats and Maja Salvador. As of 2018, Aquino and Panganiban teamed up again on-screen. He is one of the major characters in the TV series Exes Baggage.

Filmography

Television

Movies

Awards and nominations

References

External links
Carlo Aquino Official Site

Aquino Carlo Aquino on iGMA.tv
 http://news.abs-cbn.com/entertainment/02/15/18/carlo-aquino-sends-angelica-panganiban-flowers-on-valentines-day

Living people
20th-century Filipino male actors
21st-century Filipino male actors
Star Magic personalities
ABS-CBN personalities
GMA Network personalities
Filipino male child actors
Filipino male comedians
Filipino male television actors
Male actors from Metro Manila
Participants in Philippine reality television series
People from Quezon City
1985 births
Filipino male film actors